Cuenca is a canton of Ecuador, located in the Azuay Province.  Its capital is the town of Cuenca. During the census of 2001 the canton had 417,632 inhabitants  and in 2010 it had 505,585 inhabitants.

Toponymy 
The city is named after Santa Ana of the 4 Rivers of Cuenca in honor of the city of Cuenca in Spain, the birthplace of the Spanish viceroy of Peru Andrés Hurtado de Mendoza, who was the one who sent Spanish Gil Ramírez Dávalos to fund the city, and the fact that, this place, in its geographical features are very similar to the Spanish city. In addition, the name includes the fact that four rivers cross it: Tomebamba, Tarqui, Yanuncay and Machángara. The rest of the name comes from the Spanish tradition of dedicating to the new cities a saint of the Catholic church, in this case Santa Ana.

Demographics
Ethnic groups as of the Ecuadorian census of 2010:
Mestizo  89.7%
White  5.7%
Afro-Ecuadorian  2.2%
Indigenous  1.8%
Montubio  0.4%
Other  0.2%

Division 
The canton is divided into parishes. The urban sector of the city of Cuenca is formed by the following 15 parishes:

The rural territory of the canton is divided into 21 parishes:

References

Cantons of Azuay Province